Herrand (Latin Herrandus) is a masculine given name that may refer to:

Herrand, abbot of Tegernsee Abbey in 1042–1046
Herrand (bishop of Strasbourg), died 1065
Herrand (bishop of Halberstadt), died 1102
Herrand I of Wildon, nobleman, died 1222
Herrand II of Wildon, poet, died 1278
Marcel Herrand (1897–1953), French actor